This page shows the results of the Synchronized Swimming Competition at the 1979 Pan American Games, held from July 1 to July 15, 1979 in San Juan, Puerto Rico. There were three medal events. For the first time the women's solo and duet events were not won by an American.

Solo

Duet

Team

Medal table

References
 Sports 123

1979 Pan American Games
1979
1979 in synchronized swimming